"Let the Music (Lift You Up)" is a song by British house music group Loveland featuring singer Rachel McFarlane, released in 1994 as their debut single. It is a cover of a song by American singer Darlene Lewis and some of the single releases also featured both versions. The Loveland version was included on their only album, The Wonder of Love (1995), and peaked at number 16 on the UK Singles Chart. It also reached number-one on both the UK Dance Singles Chart and the UK Club Chart, and won the Best Dance Record of the Year award at the Silver Clef Award.

Critical reception
Larry Flick from Billboard wrote, "Virtually flawless disco/house number is poised to glide from atop U.K. dance charts onto stateside dancefloors within seconds. Track pumps a heavy beat, which is tied in flowing ribbons of strings and horns. Rachel McFarlane provides a bright flash of diva belting, proving her moxie by holding her own against a busy, effect-filled arrangement. Rhythm/crossover radio tastemakers are advised to open their minds and ears." Andy Beevers from Music Week declared it as a "huge house track from Manchester". He added, "The Full On Vocal Mix, with its pounding pianos and hackneyed lyrics, is undeniably old-fashioned and is about as cheesy as a lorryload of Wotsits. But it comes with a guarantee to create absolute mayhem on all but the most elite of dancefloors." James Hamilton from the RM Dance Update felt that the Loveland cover version of the Darlene Lewis song is "much more exciting". Mark Sutherland from Smash Hits gave it two out of five, viewing it as "a routine rave-up stomper by some blokes you've never heard of that will nonetheless "storm" the charts."

Track listing
 12", Europe (1994)
"Let the Music (Lift You Up)" (Full On Vocal Radio Edit)
"Let the Music (Lift You Up)" (Full On Vocal Extended Mix)	
"Let the Music (Lift You Up)" (Bottom Dollar Big Room Dub) 
"Loveland's Theme"

 CD single, France (1994)
"Let the Music (Lift You Up)" (Full On Vocal Radio Edit) — 3:29
"Let the Music (Lift You Up)" (Big Room Dub) — 5:40

 CD maxi, US (1994)
"Let the Music (Lift You Up)" (Full On Vocal Mix) — 6:14
"Let the Music (Lift You Up)" (Bottom Dollar Remix) — 5:34
"Let the Music (Lift You Up)" (Publicly Executed Dub) — 6:32
"Let the Music (Lift You Up)" (Big Room Dub) — 5:40
"Loveland's Theme" — 4:13

Charts

References

 

1994 debut singles
1994 songs
British dance songs
Eurodance songs
Garage house songs
House music songs
Music Week number-one dance singles